Egriselda López (born 1983) is a Salvadoran diplomat.

In August 2019, Ambassador López became the Permanent Representative of El Salvador to the United Nations, New York.

 
Ambassador López was appointed in November 2020, by the President of the 75th Session of the General Assembly, H.E. Mr. Volkan Bozkir, as a co-chair of the Ad Hoc working Group on the Revitalization of the Work of the General Assembly (AHWG).

 
In June 2021, Ambassador López was elected Chair of the 4th Committee (Special Political and Decolonization) of the United Nations General Assembly, for its 76th Session.
 
From 2013 to 2016, she served as Counsellor -later promoted to Minister Counsellor- at the Permanent Mission of El Salvador to the United Nations in New York. From 2010 to 2013, she was Counsellor and Deputy Head of Mission at El Salvador's Embassy in the Republic of Korea.   
 
Ambassador López began her career at the Ministry of Foreign Affairs of El Salvador in 2007, where she worked as an advisor on multilateral affairs. Besides serving as a diplomat, she has experience working in NGOs and think tanks in San Salvador and Geneva.
 
Ambassador López holds a Master of Public Administration from the John F. Kennedy School of Government at Harvard University (2018), a Master of International Affairs from the Graduate Institute of International and Development Studies (2018) in Geneva, Switzerland, and a Bachelor of International Relations from the University of El Salvador (2006).
 
At the Graduate Institute for International Development Studies, she completed a dissertation on gender parity in the Salvadoran Foreign Service (2018).
 
Ambassador López’s native language is Spanish, she speaks English, French and Portuguese.
 
Egriselda López is married and has a daughter.

References

External link

Living people
Salvadoran women diplomats
Salvadoran women's rights activists
Salvadoran LGBT politicians
Salvadoran diplomats
Ambassadors of El Salvador
Permanent Representatives of El Salvador to the United Nations
21st-century Salvadoran women politicians
21st-century Salvadoran politicians
Harvard Kennedy School alumni
Graduate Institute of International and Development Studies alumni
University of El Salvador alumni
Salvadoran expatriates in Switzerland
Women ambassadors
Nuevas Ideas politicians
1983 births